Anjum Rehbar (born 17 September 1962) is an Indian poet writing in Urdu and Hindi.

Biography
Anjum Rehbar was born in Guna district Madhya Pradesh. She completed her post-graduate studies in Urdu Literature. 

Rehbar began participating in Mushairas and Kavi sammelans in 1977, and has recited for several national television channels including ABP News, SAB TV, Sony Pal, ETV Network, DD Urdu. In recent years, she has appeared in Wah! Wah! Kya Baat Hai! on SAB TV. Anjum also turned up at the Kapil sharma show at Holi special 2019 whereby she awestruck the audience by her magnetic poetry.

Awards
In recognition of her contributions to Hindi literature Anjum Rehbar has received awards including:

Indira Gandhi Award 1986
Ram-Rikh Manhar Award
Sahitya Bharti Award
Hindi Sahitya Sammelan Award
Akhil Bhartiya Kavivar Vidyapeeth Award
Dainik Bhaskar Award
Chitransh Fiqar Gorakhpuri Award
Guna ka Gaurav Award

Book 
Malmal Kacche Rangon Ki - 2018

References

1962 births
Living people
Urdu-language poets from India
Poets from Madhya Pradesh
Indian women poets
20th-century Indian poets
20th-century Indian women writers
Women writers from Madhya Pradesh
People from Madhya Pradesh